This is a comprehensive listing of the bird species recorded in Great Smoky Mountains National Park, which is in the U.S. states of North Carolina and Tennessee. Unless otherwise noted, this list is based on one published in May 2010 by the Great Smoky Mountains Association (GSMA) with the National Park Service (NPS). The list contains 245 species.

This list is presented in the taxonomic sequence of the Check-list of North and Middle American Birds, 7th edition through the 63rd Supplement, published by the American Ornithological Society (AOS). Common and scientific names are also those of the Check-list, except that the common names of families are from the Clements taxonomy because the AOS list does not include them.

Unless otherwise noted, all species listed below are considered to occur regularly in the park as permanent residents, summer or winter visitors, or migrants. These tags are used to annotate some species:

 (U) Uncommon - "at least one seen per season of occurrence or several seen per year" per the GSMA (43 species)
 (O) Occasional - "one seen per year or less" per the GMSA (45 species)
 (R) Rare - "has occurred in park at least once, but is not to be expected" per the GMSA (53 species)
 (I) Introduced - a species introduced to North America by the actions of humans (three species)

Ducks, geese, and waterfowl
Order: AnseriformesFamily: Anatidae

The family Anatidae includes the ducks and most duck-like waterfowl, such as geese and swans. These birds are adapted to an aquatic existence with webbed feet, bills which are flattened to a greater or lesser extent, and feathers that are excellent at shedding water due to special oils.

Snow goose, Anser caerulescens (R)
Brant, Branta bernicla (R)
Canada goose, Branta canadensis (U)
Wood duck, Aix sponsa
Blue-winged teal, Spatula discors (O)
Northern shoveler, Spatula clypeata (R)
Gadwall, Mareca strepera (R)
American wigeon, Mareca americana (R)
Mallard, Anas platyrhynchos (U)
American black duck, Anas rubripes (U)
Northern pintail, Anas acuta (R)
Green-winged teal, Anas crecca carolinensis (R)
Redhead, Aythya americana (R)
Ring-necked duck, Aythya collaris (U)
Lesser scaup, Aythya affinis (R)
Harlequin duck, Histrionicus histrionicus (R)
White-winged scoter, Melanitta deglandi (R)
Bufflehead, Bucephala albeola (U)
Common goldeneye, Bucephala clangula (R)
Hooded merganser, Lophodytes cucullatus (U)
Common merganser, Mergus merganser (R)
Red-breasted merganser, Mergus serrator (R)
Ruddy duck, Oxyura jamaicensis

New World quail
Order: GalliformesFamily: Odontophoridae

The New World quails are small, plump terrestrial birds only distantly related to the quails of the Old World, but named for their similar appearance and habits.

Northern bobwhite, Colinus virginianus (U)

Pheasants, grouse, and allies
Order: GalliformesFamily: Phasianidae

Phasianidae consists of the pheasants and their allies. These are terrestrial species, variable in size but generally plump with broad relatively short wings. Many species are gamebirds or have been domesticated as a food source for humans.

Wild turkey, Meleagris gallopavo
Ruffed grouse, Bonasa umbellus

Grebes
Order: PodicipediformesFamily: Podicipedidae

Grebes are small to medium-large freshwater diving birds. They have lobed toes and are excellent swimmers and divers. However, they have their feet placed far back on the body, making them quite ungainly on land.

Pied-billed grebe, Podilymbus podiceps (U)
Horned grebe, Podiceps auritus (O)

Pigeons and doves
Order: ColumbiformesFamily: Columbidae

Pigeons and doves are stout-bodied birds with short necks and short slender bills with a fleshy cere.

Rock pigeon, Columba livia (I) (O)
Mourning dove, Zenaida macroura

Cuckoos
Order: CuculiformesFamily: Cuculidae

The family Cuculidae includes cuckoos, roadrunners, and anis. These birds are of variable size with slender bodies, long tails, and strong legs. The Old World cuckoos are brood parasites.

Yellow-billed cuckoo, Coccyzus americanus
Black-billed cuckoo, Coccyzus erythropthalmus (U)

Nightjars and allies
Order: CaprimulgiformesFamily: Caprimulgidae

Nightjars are medium-sized nocturnal birds that usually nest on the ground. They have long wings, short legs, and very short bills. Most have small feet, of little use for walking, and long pointed wings. Their soft plumage is cryptically colored to resemble bark or leaves.

Common nighthawk,  Chordeiles minor (U)
Chuck-will's-widow, Antrostomus carolinensis (U)
Eastern whip-poor-will, Antrostomus vociferus

Swifts
Order: ApodiformesFamily: Apodidae

The swifts are small birds which spend the majority of their lives flying. These birds have very short legs and never settle voluntarily on the ground, perching instead only on vertical surfaces. Many swifts have very long, swept-back wings which resemble a crescent or boomerang.

Chimney swift, Chaetura pelagica

Hummingbirds
Order: ApodiformesFamily: Trochilidae

Hummingbirds are small birds capable of hovering in mid-air due to the rapid flapping of their wings. They are the only birds that can fly backwards.

Ruby-throated hummingbird, Archilochus colubris

Rails, gallinules, and coots
Order: GruiformesFamily: Rallidae

Rallidae is a large family of small to medium-sized birds which includes the rails, crakes, coots, and gallinules. The most typical family members occupy dense vegetation in damp environments near lakes, swamps, or rivers. In general they are shy and secretive birds, making them difficult to observe. Most species have strong legs and long toes which are well adapted to soft uneven surfaces. They tend to have short, rounded wings and tend to be weak fliers.

King rail, Rallus elegans (R)
Virginia rail, Rallus limicola (R)
Sora, Porzana carolina (O)
Common gallinule, Gallinula galeata (R)
American coot, Fulica americana (R)

Cranes
Order: GruiformesFamily: Gruidae

Cranes are large, long-legged, and long-necked birds. Unlike the similar-looking but unrelated herons, cranes fly with necks outstretched, not pulled back. Most have elaborate and noisy courting displays or "dances".

Sandhill crane, Antigone canadensis (R)

Plovers and lapwings
Order: CharadriiformesFamily: Charadriidae

The family Charadriidae includes the plovers, dotterels, and lapwings. They are small to medium-sized birds with compact bodies, short thick necks, and long, usually pointed, wings. They are found in open country worldwide, mostly in habitats near water.

American golden-plover, Pluvialis dominica (R)
Semipalmated plover, Charadrius semipalmatus (O)
Killdeer, Charadrius vociferus (U)

Sandpipers and allies
Order: CharadriiformesFamily: Scolopacidae

Scolopacidae is a large diverse family of small to medium-sized shorebirds including the sandpipers, curlews, godwits, shanks, tattlers, woodcocks, snipes, dowitchers, and phalaropes. The majority of these species eat small invertebrates picked out of the mud or soil. Different lengths of legs and bills enable multiple species to feed in the same habitat, particularly on the coast, without direct competition for food.

Ruff, Calidris pugnax (R)
Least sandpiper, Calidris minutilla (O)
Short-billed dowitcher, Limnodromus griseus (R)
American woodcock, Scolopax minor (U)
Wilson's snipe, Gallinago delicata (U)
Spotted sandpiper, Actitis macularius
Solitary sandpiper, Tringa solitaria (U)
Lesser yellowlegs, Tringa flavipes (R)
Willet, Tringa semipalmata (R)
Greater yellowlegs, Tringa melanoleuca (O)
Red-necked phalarope, Phalaropus lobatus (R)
Red phalarope, Phalaropus fulicarius (R)

Gulls, terns, and skimmers
Order: CharadriiformesFamily: Laridae

Laridae is a family of medium to large seabirds and includes gulls, terns, kittiwakes, and skimmers. They are typically gray or white, often with black markings on the head or wings. They have stout, longish bills and webbed feet.

Bonaparte's gull, Chroicocephalus philadelphia (R)
Laughing gull, Leucophaeus atricilla (R)
Ring-billed gull, Larus delawarensis (O)
Herring gull, Larus argentatus (R)
Sooty tern, Onychoprion fuscatus (R)

Loons
Order: GaviiformesFamily: Gaviidae

Loons are aquatic birds the size of a large duck, to which they are unrelated. Their plumage is largely gray or black, and they have spear-shaped bills. Loons swim well and fly adequately, but are almost hopeless on land, because their legs are placed towards the rear of the body.

Red-throated loon, Gavia stellata (R)
Common loon, Gavia immer (R)

Northern storm-petrels
Order: ProcellariiformesFamily: Hydrobatidae

The storm-petrels are the smallest seabirds, relatives of the petrels, feeding on planktonic crustaceans and small fish picked from the surface, typically while hovering. The flight is fluttering and sometimes bat-like.
 
Band-rumped storm-petrel, Oceanodroma castro (R)

Cormorants and shags
Order: SuliformesFamily: Phalacrocoracidae

Cormorants are medium-to-large aquatic birds, usually with mainly dark plumage and areas of colored skin on the face. The bill is long, thin, and sharply hooked. Their feet are four-toed and webbed.

Double-crested cormorant, Nannopterum auritum (O)

Pelicans
Order: PelecaniformesFamily: Pelecanidae

Pelicans are very large water birds with a distinctive pouch under their beak. Like other birds in the order Pelecaniformes, they have four webbed toes.

American white pelican, Pelecanus erythrorhynchos (R)

Herons, egrets, and bitterns
Order: PelecaniformesFamily: Ardeidae

The family Ardeidae contains the herons, egrets, and bitterns. Herons and egrets are medium to large wading birds with long necks and legs. Bitterns tend to be shorter necked and more secretive. Members of Ardeidae fly with their necks retracted, unlike other long-necked birds such as storks, ibises, and spoonbills.

American bittern, Botaurus lentiginosus (O)
Great blue heron, Ardea herodias (U)
Great egret, Ardea alba (O)
Little blue heron, Egretta caerulea (O)
Green heron, Butorides virescens (U)
Black-crowned night-heron, Nycticorax nycticorax (R)
Yellow-crowned night-heron, Nyctanassa violacea (R)

New World vultures
Order: CathartiformesFamily: Cathartidae

The New World vultures are not closely related to Old World vultures, but superficially resemble them because of convergent evolution. Like the Old World vultures, they are scavengers, however, unlike Old World vultures, which find carcasses by sight, New World vultures have a good sense of smell with which they locate carcasses.

Black vulture, Coragyps atratus
Turkey vulture, Cathartes aura

Osprey
Order: AccipitriformesFamily: Pandionidae

Pandionidae is a family of fish-eating birds of prey, possessing a very large, powerful hooked beak for tearing flesh from their prey, strong legs, powerful talons, and keen eyesight. The family is monotypic.

Osprey, Pandion haliaetus (U)

Hawks, eagles, and kites
Order: AccipitriformesFamily: Accipitridae

Accipitridae is a family of birds of prey, which includes hawks, eagles, kites, harriers, and Old World vultures. These birds have very large powerful hooked beaks for tearing flesh from their prey, strong legs, powerful talons, and keen eyesight.

Swallow-tailed kite, Elanoides forficatus (R)
Golden eagle, Aquila chrysaetos (R)
Northern harrier, Circus hudsonius (U)
Sharp-shinned hawk, Accipiter striatus (U)
Cooper's hawk, Accipiter cooperii (U)
Northern goshawk, Accipiter gentilis (R)
Bald eagle, Haliaeetus leucocephalus (U)
Mississippi kite, Ictinia mississippiensis (R)
Red-shouldered hawk, Buteo lineatus (O)
Broad-winged hawk, Buteo platypterus
Red-tailed hawk, Buteo jamaicensis (U)

Barn-owls
Order: StrigiformesFamily: Tytonidae

Barn-owls are medium to large owls with large heads and characteristic heart-shaped faces. They have long strong legs with powerful talons.

Barn owl, Tyto alba (Was (O) before extirpation)

Owls
Order: StrigiformesFamily: Strigidae

Typical owls are small to large solitary nocturnal birds of prey. They have large forward-facing eyes and ears, a hawk-like beak, and a conspicuous circle of feathers around each eye called a facial disk.

Eastern screech-owl, Megascops asio
Great horned owl, Bubo virginianus (U)
Barred owl, Strix varia
Long-eared owl, Asio otus (R)
Short-eared owl, Asio flammeus (R)
Northern saw-whet owl, Aegolius acadicus

Kingfishers
Order: CoraciiformesFamily: Alcedinidae

Kingfishers are medium-sized birds with large heads, long, pointed bills, short legs, and stubby tails.

Belted kingfisher, Megaceryle alcyon

Woodpeckers
Order: PiciformesFamily: Picidae

Woodpeckers are small to medium-sized birds with chisel-like beaks, short legs, stiff tails, and long tongues used for capturing insects. Some species have feet with two toes pointing forward and two backward, while several species have only three toes. Many woodpeckers have the habit of tapping noisily on tree trunks with their beaks.

Red-headed woodpecker, Melanerpes erythrocephalus (O)
Red-bellied woodpecker, Melanerpes carolinus
Yellow-bellied sapsucker, Sphyrapicus varius
Downy woodpecker, Dryobates pubescens
Red-cockaded woodpecker, Dryobates borealis (O) (Before extirpation)
Hairy woodpecker, Dryobates villosus
Northern flicker, Colaptes auratus
Pileated woodpecker, Dryocopus pileatus

Falcons and caracaras
Order: FalconiformesFamily: Falconidae

Falconidae is a family of diurnal birds of prey, notably the falcons and caracaras. They differ from hawks, eagles, and kites in that they kill with their beaks instead of their talons.

American kestrel, Falco sparverius (U)
Merlin, Falco columbarius (R)
Peregrine falcon, Falco peregrinus (O) (Reintroduced after earlier extirpation)

Tyrant flycatchers
Order: PasseriformesFamily: Tyrannidae

Tyrant flycatchers are Passerine birds which occur throughout North and South America. They superficially resemble the Old World flycatchers, but are more robust and have stronger bills. They do not have the sophisticated vocal capabilities of the songbirds. Most, but not all, are rather plain. As the name implies, most are insectivorous.

Great crested flycatcher, Myiarchus crinitus
Western kingbird, Tyrannus verticalis (R)
Eastern kingbird, Tyrannus tyrannus
Scissor-tailed flycatcher, Tyrannus forficatus (R)
Olive-sided flycatcher, Contopus cooperi (O)
Eastern wood-pewee, Contopus virens
Acadian flycatcher, Empidonax virescens
Alder flycatcher, Empidonax alnorum (O)
Willow flycatcher, Empidonax traillii (O)
Least flycatcher, Empidonax minimus (U)
Eastern phoebe, Sayornis phoebe

Vireos, shrike-babblers, and erpornis
Order: PasseriformesFamily: Vireonidae

The vireos are a group of small to medium-sized passerine birds restricted to the New World. They are typically greenish in color and resemble wood warblers apart from their heavier bills.

White-eyed vireo, Vireo griseus
Yellow-throated vireo, Vireo flavifrons
Blue-headed vireo, Vireo solitarius
Philadelphia vireo, Vireo philadelphicus (O)
Warbling vireo, Vireo gilvus (O)
Red-eyed vireo, Vireo olivaceus

Shrikes
Order: PasseriformesFamily: Laniidae

Shrikes are passerine birds known for their habit of catching other birds and small animals and impaling the uneaten portions of their bodies on thorns. A shrike's beak is hooked, like that of a typical bird of prey.

Loggerhead shrike, Lanius ludovicianus (O)

Crows, jays, and magpies
Order: PasseriformesFamily: Corvidae

The family Corvidae includes crows, ravens, jays, choughs, magpies, treepies, nutcrackers, and ground jays. Corvids are above average in size among the Passeriformes, and some of the larger species show high levels of intelligence.

Blue jay, Cyanocitta cristata
American crow, Corvus brachyrhynchos
Common raven, Corvus corax

Tits, chickadees, and titmice
Order: PasseriformesFamily: Paridae

The Paridae are mainly small stocky woodland species with short stout bills. Some have crests. They are adaptable birds, with a mixed diet including seeds and insects.

Carolina chickadee, Poecile carolinensis
Black-capped chickadee, Poecile atricapilla
Tufted titmouse, Baeolophus bicolor

Larks
Order: PasseriformesFamily: Alaudidae

Larks are small terrestrial birds with often extravagant songs and display flights. Most larks are fairly dull in appearance. Their food is insects and seeds.

Horned lark, Eremophila alpestris (O)

Swallows
Order: PasseriformesFamily: Hirundinidae

The family Hirundinidae is adapted to aerial feeding. They have a slender streamlined body, long pointed wings, and a short bill with a wide gape. The feet are adapted to perching rather than walking, and the front toes are partially joined at the base.

Bank swallow, Riparia riparia (O)
Tree swallow, Tachycineta bicolor (O)
Northern rough-winged swallow, Stelgidopteryx serripennis
Purple martin, Progne subis (U)
Barn swallow, Hirundo rustica
Cliff swallow, Petrochelidon pyrrhonota (U)

Kinglets
Order: PasseriformesFamily: Regulidae

The kinglets are a small family of birds which resemble the titmice. They are very small insectivorous birds, mostly in the genus Regulus. The adults have colored crowns, giving rise to their names.

Ruby-crowned kinglet, Corthylio calendula
Golden-crowned kinglet, Regulus satrapa

Waxwings
Order: PasseriformesFamily: Bombycillidae

The waxwings are a group of passerine birds with soft silky plumage and unique red tips to some of the wing feathers. In the Bohemian and cedar waxwings, these tips look like sealing wax and give the group its name. These are arboreal birds of northern forests. They live on insects in summer and berries in winter. 
  
Cedar waxwing, Bombycilla cedrorum

Nuthatches
Order: PasseriformesFamily: Sittidae

Nuthatches are small woodland birds. They have the unusual ability to climb down trees head first, unlike other birds which can only go upwards. Nuthatches have big heads, short tails, and powerful bills and feet.

Red-breasted nuthatch, Sitta canadensis
White-breasted nuthatch, Sitta carolinensis

Treecreepers
Order: PasseriformesFamily: Certhiidae

Treecreepers are small woodland birds, brown above and white below. They have thin pointed down-curved bills, which they use to extricate insects from bark. They have stiff tail feathers, like woodpeckers, which they use to support themselves on vertical trees.

Brown creeper, Certhia americana

Gnatcatchers
Order: PasseriformesFamily: Polioptilidae

These dainty birds resemble Old World warblers in their structure and habits, moving restlessly through the foliage seeking insects. The gnatcatchers are mainly soft bluish gray in color and have the typical insectivore's long sharp bill. Many species have distinctive black head patterns (especially males) and long, regularly cocked, black-and-white tails.

Blue-gray gnatcatcher, Polioptila caerulea

Wrens
Order: PasseriformesFamily: Troglodytidae

Wrens are small and inconspicuous birds, except for their loud songs. They have short wings and thin down-turned bills. Several species often hold their tails upright. All are insectivorous.

Bewick's wren, Thryomanes bewickii (R)
Carolina wren, Thryothorus ludovicianus
House wren, Troglodytes aedon (O)
Winter wren, Troglodytes hiemalis
Sedge wren, Cistothorus platensis (O)
Marsh wren, Cistothorus palustris (O)

Mockingbirds and thrashers
Order: PasseriformesFamily: Mimidae

The mimids are a family of passerine birds which includes thrashers, mockingbirds, tremblers, and the New World catbirds. These birds are notable for their vocalization, especially their remarkable ability to mimic a wide variety of birds and other sounds heard outdoors. The species tend towards dull grays and browns in their appearance.

Gray catbird, Dumetella carolinensis
Brown thrasher, Toxostoma rufum
Northern mockingbird, Mimus polyglottos (U)

Starlings
Order: PasseriformesFamily: Sturnidae

Starlings are small to medium-sized passerine birds. They are medium-sized passerines with strong feet. Their flight is strong and direct and they are very gregarious. Their preferred habitat is fairly open country, and they eat insects and fruit. Plumage is typically dark with a metallic sheen.

European starling, Sturnus vulgaris (I) (U)

Thrushes and allies
Order: PasseriformesFamily: Turdidae

The thrushes are a group of passerine birds that occur mainly but not exclusively in the Old World. They are plump, soft plumaged, small to medium-sized insectivores or sometimes omnivores, often feeding on the ground. Many have attractive songs.

Eastern bluebird, Sialia sialis
Veery, Catharus fuscescens
Gray-cheeked thrush, Catharus minimus
Swainson's thrush, Catharus ustulatus
Hermit thrush, Catharus guttatus
Wood thrush, Hylocichla mustelina
American robin, Turdus migratorius

Old World sparrows
Order: PasseriformesFamily: Passeridae

Old World sparrows are small passerine birds. In general, sparrows tend to be small plump brownish or grayish birds with short tails and short powerful beaks. Sparrows are seed eaters, but they also consume small insects.

House sparrow, Passer domesticus (I) (U)

Wagtails and pipits
Order: PasseriformesFamily: Motacillidae

Motacillidae is a family of small passerine birds with medium to long tails. They include the wagtails, longclaws, and pipits. They are slender ground-feeding insectivores of open country.

American pipit, Anthus rubescens (O)

Finches, euphonias, and allies
Order: PasseriformesFamily: Fringillidae

Finches are seed-eating passerine birds, that are small to moderately large and have a strong beak, usually conical and in some species very large. All have twelve tail feathers and nine primaries. These birds have a bouncing flight with alternating bouts of flapping and gliding on closed wings, and most sing well.

Evening grosbeak, Coccothraustes vespertinus
Purple finch, Haemorhous purpureus
House finch, Haemorhous mexicanus (U) (Native to the southwestern U.S.; introduced in the east)
Common redpoll, Acanthis flammea (R)
Red crossbill, Loxia curvirostra (U)
White-winged crossbill, Loxia leucoptera (R)
American goldfinch, Spinus tristis

Longspurs and snow buntings
Order: PasseriformesFamily: Calcariidae

The Calcariidae are a group of passerine birds that were traditionally grouped with the New World sparrows, but differ in a number of respects and are usually found in open grassy areas.

Chestnut-collared longspur, Calcarius ornatus (R)
Snow bunting, Plectrophenax nivalis (R)

New world sparrows
Order: PasseriformesFamily: Passerellidae

Until 2017, these species were considered part of the family Emberizidae. Most of the species are known as sparrows, but these birds are not closely related to the Old World sparrows which are in the family Passeridae. Many of these have distinctive head patterns.

Bachman's sparrow, Peucaea aestivalis (R)
Grasshopper sparrow, Ammodramus savannarum (O)
Lark sparrow, Chondestes grammacus (R)
Chipping sparrow, Spizella passerina
Field sparrow, Spizella pusilla
Fox sparrow, Passerella iliaca
Dark-eyed junco, Junco hyemalis
White-crowned sparrow, Zonotrichia leucophrys (O)
White-throated sparrow, Zonotrichia albicollis
Vesper sparrow, Pooecetes gramineus (O)
LeConte's sparrow, Ammospiza leconteii (R)
Henslow's sparrow, Centronyx henslowii (O)
Savannah sparrow, Passerculus sandwichensis (U)
Song sparrow, Melospiza melodia
Lincoln's sparrow, Melospiza lincolnii (O)
Swamp sparrow, Melospiza georgiana
Eastern towhee, Pipilo erythrophthalmus

Yellow-breasted chat
Order: PasseriformesFamily: Icteriidae

This species was historically placed in the wood-warblers (Parulidae) but nonetheless most authorities were unsure if it belonged there. It was placed in its own family in 2017.

Yellow-breasted chat, Icteria virens (U)

Troupials and allies
Order: PasseriformesFamily: Icteridae

The icterids are a group of small to medium-sized, often colorful passerine birds restricted to the New World and include the grackles, New World blackbirds, and New World orioles. Most species have black as a predominant plumage color, often enlivened by yellow, orange, or red.

Yellow-headed blackbird, Xanthocephalus xanthocephalus (R)
Bobolink, Dolichonyx oryzivorus (U)
Eastern meadowlark, Sturnella magna
Orchard oriole, Icterus spurius (U)
Baltimore oriole, Icterus galbula (U)
Red-winged blackbird, Agelaius phoeniceus
Brown-headed cowbird, Molothrus ater
Rusty blackbird, Euphagus carolinus (U)
Brewer's blackbird, Euphagus cyanocephalus (R)
Common grackle, Quiscalus quiscula

New World warblers
Order: PasseriformesFamily: Parulidae

The wood-warblers are a group of small and often colorful passerine birds restricted to the New World. Most are arboreal, but some, like the ovenbird and the two waterthrushes, are more terrestrial. Most members of this family are insectivores.

Ovenbird, Seiurus aurocapilla
Worm-eating warbler, Helmitheros vermivorus
Louisiana waterthrush, Parkesia motacilla
Northern waterthrush, Parkesia noveboracensis (O)
Golden-winged warbler, Vermivora chrysoptera (O)
Blue-winged warbler, Vermivora cyanoptera
Black-and-white warbler, Mniotilta varia
Prothonotary warbler, Protonotaria citrea (O)
Swainson's warbler, Limnothlypis swainsonii (U)
Tennessee warbler, Leiothlypis peregrina
Orange-crowned warbler, Leiothlypis celata (O)
Nashville warbler, Leiothlypis ruficapilla
Connecticut warbler, Oporornis agilis (O)
Mourning warbler, Geothlypis philadelphia (R)
Kentucky warbler, Geothlypis formosa (U)
Common yellowthroat, Geothlypis trichas
Hooded warbler, Setophaga citrina
American redstart, Setophaga ruticilla
Cape May warbler, Setophaga tigrina
Cerulean warbler, Setophaga cerulea
Northern parula, Setophaga americana
Magnolia warbler, Setophaga magnolia
Bay-breasted warbler, Setophaga castanea
Blackburnian warbler, Setophaga fusca
Yellow warbler, Setophaga petechia
Chestnut-sided warbler, Setophaga pensylvanica
Blackpoll warbler, Setophaga striata
Black-throated blue warbler, Setophaga caerulescens
Palm warbler, Setophaga palmarum (O)
Pine warbler, Setophaga pinus (O)
Yellow-rumped warbler, Setophaga coronata
Yellow-throated warbler, Setophaga dominica
Prairie warbler, Setophaga discolor (U)
Black-throated green warbler, Setophaga virens
Canada warbler, Cardellina canadensis
Wilson's warbler, Cardellina pusilla (O)

Cardinals and allies
Order: PasseriformesFamily: Cardinalidae

The cardinals are a family of robust, seed-eating birds with strong bills. They are typically associated with open woodland. The sexes usually have distinct plumages.

Summer tanager, Piranga rubra (U)
Scarlet tanager, Piranga olivacea
Northern cardinal, Cardinalis cardinalis
Rose-breasted grosbeak, Pheucticus ludovicianus
Blue grosbeak, Passerina caerulea (O)
Indigo bunting, Passerina cyanea
Dickcissel, Spiza americana (O)

References

See also
List of birds of North Carolina
List of birds of Tennessee
List of birds
Lists of birds by region
List of North American birds

North Carolina, Great Smoky Mountains
Great Smoky Mountains National Park